Aukland may refer to:

People
Aukland (surname), a list of people with the surname Aukland

Places
Aukland, Torridal, village in the Torridal valley in Kristiansand municipality in Vest-Agder county, Norway
Aukland, Lindesnes, village in Lindesnes municipality in Vest-Agder county, Norway
Aukland or Auklandshamn, a village in Sveio municipality in Vestland county, Norway

See also
Auckland, the largest city of New Zealand
Augland (disambiguation)